Michel Butter (born 5 November 1985) is a Dutch long-distance runner.

He was the silver medallist over 10,000 metres at the 2007 European Athletics U23 Championships and represented his country at the 2008 European Cross Country Championships, coming ninth in the senior men's race. Butter was the winner of the Tilburg Warandeloop in 2008 and won the half marathon at the 2009 Berenloop road race. He was 16th in the race at the 2010 European Cross Country Championships.

He made his marathon debut at the 2011 Utrecht Marathon and won on his first attempt with a time of 2:17:35 hours. The race was reduced to a national level event that year as prize money was directly solely to Dutch runners. He significantly improved his best time at the 2011 Amsterdam Marathon, where his time of 2:12:59 hours brought him the Dutch national title and 15th position overall. At the 2012 Boston Marathon, he was seventh and the top European in a race slowed by hot conditions. In the 2012 Amsterdam Marathon, he took 12th place, in a new personal best of 2:09:58 hours.

Career highlights

International achievements

National achievements
Dutch National Championships
2004 - 1st, 5,000 m (juniors)
2004 - 1st, cross-country (juniors)
2006 - Schoorl, 2nd, 10,000 m
2006 - The Hague, 2nd, Half marathon
2007 - 1st, cross-country
2007 - 1st, 10,000 m
2007 - Amsterdam, 1st, 5,000 m (track)
2008 - Gilze en Rijen, 1st, cross-country
2008 - The Hague, 1st, Half marathon
2008 - 1st, 10,000 m
2009 - Amsterdam, 1st, 5,000 m (track)
2011 - Amsterdam Marathon, 1st Dutch (15th)

Personal bests

Track

Road

References

External links

Profile at Team Distance Runners 

1985 births
Living people
Dutch male long-distance runners
Dutch male marathon runners
Sportspeople from Beverwijk
21st-century Dutch people